Anemia rotundifolia is a fern species in the genus Anemia, sometimes called flowering ferns.

Schizaeales